Yuriy Shevel (born 29 January 1988, in Vyshneve, Ukrainian SSR) is a Ukrainian football forward.

Club statistics
 Total matches played for FC Olimpia Bălți in Moldavian First League: 22 matches, 6 goals.

References

External links

1988 births
Living people
People from Vyshneve
Ukrainian footballers
Association football forwards
FC Dynamo-2 Kyiv players
FC Dynamo-3 Kyiv players
Nyíregyháza Spartacus FC players
Kaposvölgye VSC footballers
FC Dnister Ovidiopol players
CSF Bălți players
FC Dacia Chișinău players
FC Guria Lanchkhuti players
FC Zugdidi players
SC Tavriya Simferopol players
Ukrainian expatriate footballers
Expatriate footballers in Moldova
Expatriate footballers in Georgia (country)
Expatriate footballers in Hungary
Ukrainian expatriate sportspeople in Hungary
Ukrainian expatriate sportspeople in Moldova
Ukrainian expatriate sportspeople in Georgia (country)
Sportspeople from Kyiv Oblast